Brushturkey, brush-turkey or brush turkey generally refer to birds in three genera in the megapode family, and sometimes to other species such as the Australian bustard:

Megapodes
Alectura
 Australian brushturkey, Alectura lathami
Aepypodius
 Wattled brushturkey, Aepypodius arfakianus
 Waigeo brushturkey, Aepypodius bruijnii
Talegalla
 Red-billed brushturkey, Talegalla cuvieri
 Black-billed brushturkey, Talegalla fuscirostris
 Collared brushturkey, Talegalla jobiensis

See also
 Bush turkey (disambiguation)

Megapodiidae
Birds by common name